Anthony Turpin   was an English politician who sat in the House of Commons  between 1601 and 1611.

In 1601, Turpin was elected Member of Parliament for Camelford. He was re-elected MP for Camelford in 1604.

References

Year of birth missing
Year of death missing
Members of the pre-1707 English Parliament for constituencies in Cornwall
Place of birth missing
English MPs 1601
English MPs 1604–1611